Viacheslav Lenskii (born 17 August 1992) is a Russian Paralympic swimmer who represented Russian Paralympic Committee athletes at the 2020 Summer Paralympics.

Career
Lenskii represented Russian Paralympic Committee athletes at the 2020 Summer Paralympics in the 400 metre freestyle S6 event and won a bronze medal.

References

1992 births
Living people
Sportspeople from Samara, Russia
Medalists at the World Para Swimming Championships
Paralympic swimmers of Russia
Swimmers at the 2020 Summer Paralympics
Medalists at the 2020 Summer Paralympics
Paralympic medalists in swimming
Paralympic bronze medalists for the Russian Paralympic Committee athletes
Russian male freestyle swimmers
S6-classified Paralympic swimmers
20th-century Russian people
21st-century Russian people